The 2010 Budapest Assembly election was held on 3 October 2010, concurring with other local elections in Hungary. This was the last election for the Assembly with party-list proportional rules. The size of the Assembly was reduced from 66 members to 33 at this election.

Mayor 

Fidesz–KDNP candidate István Tarlós won the mayoral election with 53.37% of the vote.

Results 

List seats were distributed using the D'Hondt method.

Notes

References 

2010 in Hungary
2010 elections in Europe
Local elections in Hungary
History of Budapest